FCO may mean:

 Buenos Aires Western Railway
 Club Ferro Carril Oeste, an Argentine football club
 Farm Cove Observatory, in New Zealand
 Federal Cartel Office, in Germany
 Fellow of the College of Organists
 Financial control officer, one of various names for a management-level position responsible for supervising the quality of accounting and financial reporting of an organization, also known as a comptroller
 Foreign and Commonwealth Office, the United Kingdom's Ministry of Foreign Affairs
 Fort Collins, Colorado, United States
 Leonardo da Vinci–Fiumicino Airport, near Rome, Italy
 Final Certificate of Occupancy